Pengkalan Chepa is a town and parliamentary constituency in Kelantan, Malaysia. 

Pengkalan Chepa is where the Sultan Ismail Petra Airport is located. It is located about 8 km from Kota Bharu.

Kota Bharu District
Towns in Kelantan